Music Catch is a music game available for the iOS, Mac OS X, and Windows platforms by Reflexive Entertainment. The fairly simple gameplay is centered on catching, with the cursor, different colored falling shapes that appear on screen in sync with the music playing in the background; shapes of some colors grant extra points while touching red notes incurs penalties. Music Catch has attained great popularity among flash gaming sites such as Kongregate.

The song featured in the online version is titled "Before Dawn" and was written by Music Catch'''s developer, Isaac Shepard.

In addition to being playable for free on the web, Reflexive Entertainment has also released a downloadable version that is available for purchase. The downloadable version of Music Catch includes the ability to play along to any MP3 in the user's library. Shepard has stated that this was his original intent all along, but the online version could not accommodate this feature, hence work began on the downloadable version. In May 2009, a version of Music Catch was released for the iOS. A sequel to the game, Music Catch 2'', has also been released online.

External links
 Official Music Catch site
 Isaac Shepard's Official Site

References 

2008 video games
IOS games
MacOS games
Music generated games
Music video games
Reflexive Entertainment games
Video games developed in the United States
Windows games